Hurricane Newton was one of the few tropical cyclones that were intercepted by Hurricane Hunter flights during the active 1986 Pacific hurricane season. It made landfall on the Baja California Peninsula in September of that year, causing minor damage. Newton was the twenty-first depression, fourteenth named storm, and sixth hurricane of the season. A tropical depression formed near Central America on September 18; two days later, the depression was upgraded into a tropical storm. Moving towards to northwest, Newton strengthened into a hurricane on September 21. After paralleling the coast, Newton move ashore near Cabo San Lucas on September 22. Shortly after entering the Gulf of California, the hurricane attaining its peak intensity of 85 mph (145 km/h). The following day, Newton moved ashore the Mexican mainland. Newton dissipated on September 23. However, the remnants of Newton continued across the United States and eventually emerged into the Atlantic Ocean. While 40 homes lost their roofs, damage in Mexico was fairly minor, and no fatalities were reported in association with Newton, though the remnants produced fairly heavy rains in the Great Plains.

Meteorological history

The origins of Newton were from a tropical disturbed weather near Nicaragua in mid-September. Steered by an upper-level trough located over the Western United States, the system moved westward and developed into a tropical depression at 1200 UTC on September 18. The system steadily intensified as it paralleled the Mexican coast, and was upgraded into Tropical Storm Newton early on September 20. Meanwhile, the storm turned northwest.

Shortly after becoming a hurricane, a NOAA Hurricane Hunter aircraft investigated Newton. Hurricane Newton was one of the few storms to be intercepted by the aircraft that season. After moving north-northwest, the hurricane briefly turned northwest, in the general direction of the Baja California Peninsula the next day. On 1800 UTC September 22, Hurricane Newton made landfall  from Cape Pulmo, a town situated northeast of Cabo San Lucas as a Category 1 hurricane on the Saffir-Simpson Hurricane Scale. By 1800 UTC September 23, the hurricane moved ashore near Punta Rosa and quickly dissipated. The remains of the cyclone moved into New Mexico. The remnants of Hurricane Newton transversed the Central United States and the Mid-Atlantic States until it entered the Atlantic Ocean later in the month.

Preparations and impact
Prior to the system's first landfall, the EPHC noted the threat of high waves, storm surge, and flooding. In addition, the navy, army, and police were on high alert in populated areas like La Paz due to the hurricane. On the mainland, roughly 700 people evacuated to shelters in Huatampo, a city that at that time had a population of 9,000, and Yavaros prior to landfall, but within hours after the passage of the hurricane, all but 127 had returned home.

Upon making landfall on the Baja California Peninsula, moderate rainfall was recorded though officials reported no emergencies. In Huatabampo, roofs were blown off of 40 homes. High winds blew down trees and utility poles. Overall, damage in Mexico was minor and less than anticipated. No injuries or fatalities were reported in association with Newton. Because Hurricane Newton, along with a cold front, was predicted to cause heavy rains over portions of the United States, flash flood warnings and watches were issued by the National Weather Service for parts of western Texas, New Mexico, and Arizona. The rainfall extended as far east as Pennsylvania. In Kansas City, Missouri, 20,000 customers were without power since heavy rainfall downed power lines.

See also

Other tropical cyclones named Newton
Hurricane Roslyn-similar storm
Hurricane Paine-similar storm
1986 Pacific hurricane season
List of Pacific hurricanes

References

1986 Pacific hurricane season
Pacific hurricanes in Mexico
Category 1 Pacific hurricanes
Newton